Mozhginsky District (Možga joros) is an administrative and municipal district (raion), one of the twenty-five in the Udmurt Republic, Russia. It is located in the southwest of the republic. Its administrative center is the town of Mozhga (which is not administratively a part of the district). Population:  30,358 (2002 Census);

Geography
The Vala River is the main river in the district.

Administrative and municipal status
Within the framework of administrative divisions, Mozhginsky District is one of the twenty-five in the republic. The town of Mozhga serves as its administrative center, despite being incorporated separately as a town of republic significance—an administrative unit with the status equal to that of the districts.

As a municipal division, the district is incorporated as Mozhginsky Municipal District. The town of republic significance of Mozhga is incorporated separately from the district as Mozhga Urban Okrug.

Demographics
Ethnic composition (according to the 2002 Census):
Udmurt people: 64%
Russians: 30%
Tatars and other: 4%

References

Notes

Sources

Districts of Udmurtia